Leninsky is an urban locality (an urban-type settlement) in Aldansky District of the Sakha Republic, Russia, located  from Aldan, the administrative center of the district. As of the 2010 Census, its population was 1,866.

History
It was founded in 1926 as a gold-mining base and was known as Nizhne-Stalinsk until 1962. The name referred to Joseph Stalin, with the "Nizhne-" part meaning lower, to differentiate it from the now disappeared settlements of Sredne-Stalinsk and Verkhne-Stalinsk further upstream. Urban-type settlement status was granted to it in 1932.

Administrative and municipal status
Within the framework of administrative divisions, the urban-type settlement of Leninsky is, together with one rural locality (the selo of Yakokut), incorporated within Aldansky District as the Settlement of Leninsky. As a municipal division, the territories of the Settlement of Leninsky and the Settlement of Lebediny are incorporated within Aldansky Municipal District as Leninsky Urban Settlement.

Economy
Gold mining in Leninsky stopped in 1998.

The Amur–Yakutsk Mainline railway passes nearby, as does the A360 Lena Highway to Yakutsk.

References

Notes

Sources
Official website of the Sakha Republic. Registry of the Administrative-Territorial Divisions of the Sakha Republic. Aldansky District. 

Urban-type settlements in the Sakha Republic